Ganesan a/l Retanam, also known as R. Ganesan is a Malaysian politician from Malaysian Indian Congress. He was the Speaker of Perak State Legislative Assembly from 2009 to 2013 and Member of Perak State Legislative Assembly for Sungkai from 1999 to 2008.

Political Career

Speaker of Perak State Legislative Assembly 
On 8 May 2009, a vote of no confidence towards the by-then Speaker of  Perak State Legislative Assembly, V. Sivakumar, had been passed. Then, Barisan Nasional has nominated Ganesan to the Office of Secretary of Perak State Legislative Assembly to be the new Speaker for the Perak State Legislative Assembly and he has been chosen as the new Speaker.

Election results

Honours 
  :
  Knight Commander of the Order of the Perak State Crown (DPMP) – Dato' (2004)

See also 

 Sungkai (state constituency)
 2009 Perak constitutional crisis

References 

Malaysian people of Indian descent
Members of the Perak State Legislative Assembly
Malaysian Indian Congress politicians
1952 births
Living people